is a junction passenger railway station located in the city of  Kashima, Ibaraki Prefecture, Japan, operated by the East Japan Railway Company (JR East) and the by the third sector Kashima Rinkai Railway.

Lines
Kashimajingū Station is served by the Kashima Line, and is located 14.2 km from the official starting point of the line at Katori Station. The station is also served by the trains of the Ōarai Kashima Line. The adjacent Kashima Soccer Stadium Station is the boundary of the Kashima Line and the Ōarai Kashima Line.

Station layout
The station consists of one elevated island platform with the station building underneath. The station is staffed.

Platforms

History
The station opened on August 20, 1970. The station was absorbed into the JR East network upon the privatization of the Japanese National Railways (JNR) on 1 April 1987.

Passenger statistics
In fiscal 2019, the JR station was used by an average of 968 passengers daily (boarding passengers only).

Surrounding area
Kashima Shrine

Bus routes
For Tokyo Station or Tokyo Disney Resort
For Choshi Station
For Asō Onsen "Shiraho no Yu" via Itako Station and Suigō-Itako Bus Terminal

See also
 List of railway stations in Japan

References

External links

 JR East Station Information 
  Kashima Rinkai Testudo Station Information 

Railway stations in Ibaraki Prefecture
Kashima Line
Railway stations in Japan opened in 1970